Demara is a surname. Notable people with the surname include:

 Alexa Demara, American actress and model
 Ferdinand Waldo Demara, American imposter, actor, and college founder

See also
 Demerara (disambiguation)